The 2008–09 East of Scotland Football League was the 80th season of the East of Scotland Football League. Whitehill Welfare were the defending champions. The league was split into two separate divisions, the Premier Division and the First Division, each featuring twelve teams.

This season saw Edinburgh Athletic amalgamate with Leith Athletic who took the former's place in the league, and the departure of Annan Athletic who left to join the Scottish Football League. Gretna 2008 was elected in their place.

Premier Division

League table

First Division

League table

References

4